is a 1978 Japanese jidaigeki film written and directed by Kon Ichikawa. It is based on the "Dawn" storyline from Osamu Tezuka's manga of the same title.

Himiko, the queen of Yamatai, orders her subordinates to search for the Phoenix, which is said to have eternal life for those who drinks its blood.

Cast
 Tomisaburo Wakayama as Sarutahaiko, General of the Yamatai 
 Toshinori Omi as Nagi
 Masao Kusakari as Yumihiko of Matsuro 
 Mieko Takamine as Queen Himiko of Yamatai 
 Ken Tanaka as Takeru
 Mitsuko Kusabue as Iyo
 Masaya Oki as Uraji
 Akiji Kobayashi as Yamatai
 Reiko Ohara as Hinaku
 Tōru Emori as Susano
 Takeshi Kato as Kamamushi
 Hideji Ōtaki as Sukune
 Jun Fubuki as Oro
 Kaoru Yumi as Uzume
 Junzaburo Ban as Oro
 Tatsuya Nakadai as Jingi the Conqueror, leader of the Takamagahara Ninigi

References

External links
 

1978 films
Films directed by Kon Ichikawa
Samurai films
Jidaigeki films
1970s Japanese-language films
Live-action films based on manga
Cultural depictions of Himiko
1970s Japanese films